The 2006 Australian Carrera Cup Championship was a CAMS sanctioned motor racing title for drivers of Porsche 911 GT3 Cup Cars. It was the fourth Australian Carrera Cup Championship.

Calendar
The championship was contested over an eight round series with three races per round.
 Round 1, Adelaide Parklands Circuit, South Australia, 23-26 March
 Round 2, Wakefield Park Raceway, New South Wales, 26-28 May
 Round 3, Hidden Valley Raceway, Northern Territory, 30 June - 1 July
 Round 4, Oran Park Motorsport Circuit, New South Wales, 11-13 August
 Round 5, Sandown International Motor Raceway, Victoria, 1-3 September
 Round 6, Mount Panorama Circuit, Bathurst, New South Wales, 5-8 October
 Round 7, Surfers Paradise Street Circuit, Queensland, 20-22 October
 Round 8, Phillip Island Grand Prix Circuit, Victoria, 8-10 December

The series was administered by CupCar Australia and promoted as the “Wright, Patton, Shakespeare Carrera Cup Australia”.

Points system
Championship points were awarded in each race on the following basis:

Results

References

External links
 Technical Regulations for the 2006 Australian Carrera Cup Championship at www.cams.com.au via web.archive.org

Australian Carrera Cup Championship seasons
Carrera Cup